Alexander Low may refer to:
 Alexander Low (British Army officer) (1817–1904), general
 Alexander Low, Lord Low (1845–1910), Scottish judge
 Alex Low (fl. 1933), Scottish footballer